Esther Danilovna Epstein (born May 10, 1954) is a United States chess player and systems manager, who has won the U.S. Women's Chess Champion in 1991 and 1997. She holds a Woman International Master title.

Still in the USSR, Epstein was the USSR Women's Vice-Champion in 1976. She has played for the U.S. Women's Olympiad team four times.

She is married to chess grandmaster Alexander Ivanov.

References

External links
Another page on Esther Epstein at the US Chess Federation.

Epstein page at the US Chess Federation
Interview With Esther Epstein

American chess players
Jewish chess players
Chess Woman International Masters
1954 births
Living people
American sportswomen
21st-century American women